Land of Hope and Gloria is a British sitcom starring Sheila Ferguson, which aired for six episodes on ITV in 1992.

Plot

Gloria Hepburn is a leisure manager from the United States who is appointed as the new business manager of Beaumont House, a stately home of Gerald Hope-Beaumont.

Gloria is brought to improve the finances of the business. She encounters a culture clash, particularly from Evelyn Spurling and Nancy Princeton who like to do things in an old fashioned British manner.

Cast

Sheila Ferguson as Gloria Hepburn 
Joan Sanderson as  Nancy Princeton
Andrew Bicknell as Gerald Hope-Beaumont
Daphne Oxenford as Evelyn Spurling 
Vivien Darke as Vanessa
John Rapley as Crompton

Reception

The show was critically panned. It was considered one of the worst British sitcoms ever made.

References

External links

1992 British television series debuts
1992 British television series endings
1990s British sitcoms
ITV sitcoms
English-language television shows
Works about immigration to Europe
Television shows produced by Thames Television